Sarah Hart is an award-winning musician and songwriter in Nashville, Tennessee.

Originally from Lancaster, Ohio, Hart graduated with a degree in music theory and contemporary composition from The Ohio State University. Now based in Nashville, Tennessee, she works as a singer-songwriter writing music for television, film, audiobooks, pop, rock, but mostly Contemporary Christian music and hymns. Hart has cited that the label 'Christian Music' can be applied to worship songs as well as secular saying "I can listen to a worship song and then I can listen to Jackson Browne and feel there's something equally Christian about it." "If you have faith in something bigger than yourself, then whatever you do in life, that belief's going to leak into all of it." She has composed music recorded by artists including Amy Grant ("Better Than a Hallelujah",) Celtic Woman, Matt Maher (Flesh and Bone) and The Newsboys. Hart's hymns are published by Oregon Catholic Press.

Film and television 
Hart and Ben Glover co-wrote the song "All I've Ever Needed" by AJ Michalka from the Grace Unplugged soundtrack. Hart's song "All These Things" (Hart, Scott Dente, Ken Lewis) was featured on Dark Desires.

Audiobooks and animation work 
Hart has written scores for Vooks children's audiobooks and animated works, including Where Does Kitty Go in the Rain? by Harriet Zeifert, Curious George Plants A Tree by H.A. Rey and Margret Rey and other books in the Curious George series. Hart has scored audiobooks and animated works for Scholastic, including Say Something, The Word Collector, and Be You by Peter H. Reynolds. and the award winning audiobook Du Iz Tak by Carson Ellis.

Awards 
Hart is a Grammy nominee for Best Gospel Song and BMI Winner (Christian Song of the Year "Better Than a Hallelujah"), a Production Music Association Mark Award 2020 Winner for Best Vocal Track for the song ("This Moment"), an American Library Association ALA Odyssey Award Winner (Excellence in Audiobook Production, Score Writer, "Du Iz Tak") and an Audie Awards nominee (Excellence in Audiobooks, Score Writer, "Say Something").

Notable performances 
In October 2013, Hart performed for Pope Francis in St. Peter's Square at the World Meeting of Families in Rome.

Personal life 
Hart resides in Nashville, Tennessee with her husband and two daughters. Hart is the biological daughter of folk musician Oz Bach.

References 

Year of birth missing (living people)
Living people
21st-century American women musicians
21st-century women composers
Performers of contemporary Christian music
American performers of Christian music
American women hymnwriters
Christian music songwriters
Musicians from Nashville, Tennessee
People from Lancaster, Ohio
Ohio State University alumni